The Open Ice Mall Cup is a figure skating competition which is generally held in February in Eilat, Israel. Medals are awarded in men's singles, ladies' singles, pairs, and ice dancing.

Senior medalists

Men

Ladies

Pairs

Ice dancing

Junior medalists

Junior men

Junior ladies

Junior pairs

Junior ice dancing

Advanced novice medalists

Advanced novice men

Advanced novice ladies

Advanced novice ice dancing

References 

Figure skating competitions
International figure skating competitions hosted by Israel